LCSR may refer to:

 JHU LCSR: Laboratory for Computational Sensing and Robotics at Johns Hopkins University
 The Laboratory for Computer Science Research at Rutgers University
 Liverpool, Crosby and Southport Railway
 Landing Craft, Swimmer Reconnaissance
 Larger Caliber, Soft Recoil